The Golden Fleece is an inn in York, England, which has a free house pub on the ground floor and four guest bedrooms above. It dates back to at least the early 16th century, and claims to be the most haunted public house in York.

History
The Golden Fleece was mentioned in the York City Archives as far back as 1503. 
The back yard of the inn is named "Lady Peckett's Yard" after Alice Peckett, the wife of John Peckett who owned the premises as well as being Lord Mayor of York around 1702.

The inn was rebuilt in the 19th century.
In 1983, it was designated as a grade II listed building by English Heritage.

The inn claims to be the most haunted public house in the City of York. It was featured in Most Haunted, a television series about supposedly paranormal phenomena.

Architecture
The pub is situated on the Pavement in the centre of York. It is next to the Herbert House, a Grade I listed building which has a first floor jetty incorporated into a side passage of the Golden Fleece. It is opposite the historic street called The Shambles.

The pub has a recognisable large golden fleece hanging above the door. Whilst the pub has a narrow frontage, it is very deep, with a front bar, a corridor containing staircases and toilets leading to second bar, and past that a space with dining tables. There is further dining space upstairs, in an old-fashioned room with a set of armour.

See also
List of oldest companies

References

External links

The Golden Fleece, York

Grade II listed pubs in York
Reportedly haunted locations in North East England